Simon Goldblatt QC (born December 1928 – 2 November 2021), was a British Barrister and was a Liberal Party politician.

Background
Goldblatt was born in 1928.

Professional career
Goldblatt was called to the Bar in 1953. He joined chambers soon thereafter. He took silk in 1972 (having effectively been positively invited to do so by the appellate committee of the House of Lords, one of whose members had commented in one case that they “took it most ill that submissions of that calibre come otherwise than from the front bench”).

He was head of chambers at Essex chambers from 1983 until 1986. He practised there since then, with occasional stints as a Deputy High Court Judge where he had a tendency to find alternative paths to correct jurisprudence to those presented to him by counsel. He was still attending chambers daily, up to some weeks before his death. His personal interests included foreign travel, philately, and porcelain.

Political career
Goldblatt was President of the West Midlands Young Liberals Federation. He was a Member of the Liberal Party Council. He was Liberal candidate for the Rugby division of Warwickshire at the 1959 General Election. He was Liberal candidate again for Rugby at the 1964 General Election. 
He was Liberal candidate for the Twickenham division of Middlesex at the 1966 General Election. He did not stand for parliament again.

Election results

See also
Rugby (UK Parliament constituency)
Twickenham (UK Parliament constituency)

References

1928 births
2021 deaths
Liberal Party (UK) parliamentary candidates
People educated at Eton College
Alumni of Trinity Hall, Cambridge
Members of Gray's Inn
English barristers